Revere House (1847–1912) was an upscale hotel in 19th-century Boston, Massachusetts, located on Bowdoin Square in the West End. Fire destroyed the building in 1912.

Brief history

William Washburn designed the hotel building, constructed in 1847 on the former site of the house of Boston merchant Kirk Boott. The hotel was a project of the Massachusetts Charitable Mechanic Association. The association named their new hotel after Paul Revere, one of the founders of the group.

Notable guests

Some considered Revere House "Boston's most prestigious hotel. It hosted the likes of writer Charles Dickens, singer Jenny Lind ("The Swedish Nightingale"). ... Famed orator Daniel Webster often used the portico to address crowds at political rallies." Other notable guests: Ulysses S. Grant, Millard Fillmore, Franklin Pierce, Andrew Johnson, William Tecumseh Sherman, Walt Whitman, Edward VII, Emperor Pedro II of Brazil, Philip Sheridan, the Iwakura Mission of Japan, and singers Christina Nilsson and Adelina Patti.  Grand Duke Alexei Alexandrovich of Russia stayed at the Revere House in December 1871 when he visited Boston as part of his grand tour of the United States.

Ownership and management

Through the years, owners included Otis Norcross, Frederick W. Lincoln, Uriel Crocker, Nathaniel J. Bradlee. Paran Stevens served as manager for many years. Management companies overseeing hotel operations included Chapin, Gurney & Co.;  C.B. Ferrin;  and beginning in 1885, J.F. Morrow & Co.

Images

References

External links

 
 New York Historical Society. Toothpaste box, "Henry A. Choate/ Druggist/ Under Revere House, Boston," circa 1880–1930

Former buildings and structures in Boston
Hotel buildings completed in 1847
Demolished hotels in the United States
West End, Boston
19th century in Boston
Hotels in Boston
1847 establishments in Massachusetts